Montipora patula, also called the sandpaper or ringed rice coral, is a coral species in the family Acroporidae endemic to Hawaii.

References

Acroporidae
Cnidarians of the Pacific Ocean
Cnidarians of Hawaii